Tamás Lucsánszky is a Hungarian football manager. He is currently the manager of MTK Budapest FC in the Nemzeti Bajnokság I.

Managerial career

Nyíregyháza
On 16 June 2017, it was announced that Lucsánszky is going to be the manager of Nyíregyháza.

MTK Budapest
On 12 March 2019 he was appointed as the manager of the Nemzeti Bajnokság I club MTK Budapest after Tamás Feczkó's removal. In an interview with the club, Lucsánszky said that he had been working for 20 years to get this opportunity. He also admitted that he is an MTK supporter. His first ever Nemzeti Bajnokság I match ended with a 3–2 defeat against Puskás Akadémia FC at the Pancho Aréna on the 25th match day of the 2018–19 Nemzeti Bajnokság I.

Managerial record

References

1966 births
Living people
Hungarian football managers
MTK Budapest FC managers
Mezőkövesdi SE managers
Budaörsi SC managers
Nyíregyháza Spartacus FC managers
Soroksár SC managers
Nemzeti Bajnokság I managers